Brigade Nord (Brig. N.; Northern Brigade) is the major combat formation and only brigade of the Norwegian Army. The Brigade will raise 1 new Armoured Battalion in 2026-32. 2nd Battalion are converting to Armoured Battalion from 2020. It is mostly based in mid-Troms (Bardu and Målselv) north of the Arctic Circle. Until 2009, the brigade was part of the 6th Division.

Organization 

 Brigade Nord, in Bardufoss
 Brigade Command, in Bardufoss
 Armoured Battalion (Panserbataljonen), in Setermoen with Leopard 2A4NO main battle tanks and CV90 infantry fighting vehicles
 Telemark Battalion (Telemark Bataljon), in Rena with Leopard 2A4NO main battle tanks and CV9030N infantry fighting vehicles
 2nd Battalion (2. Bataljon), in Skjold mechanized infantry with CV9030N and M113 armored personnel carrier
 4th Mechanised Battalion (4. Mekaniserte bataljon) being formed in Setermoen Plans called for a 2026 deadline for the formation of the battalion, but the 2022 Russian invasion of Ukraine has sped up the process. 
 Artillery Battalion (Artilleribataljonen), in Setermoen with K9 Thunder self-propelled howitzers and SHORAD
 Combat Air Defence Battery (Kampluftvernbatteri) with the air surveillance and fire control components of a NASAMS 3 battery and surface-launched AMRAAM missiles mounted on Humvee. Surface-launched IRIS-T missiles to be added.
 Combat Engineer Battalion (Ingeniørbataljonen), in Skjold
 Signal Battalion (Sambandsbataljonen), in Bardufoss
 Medical Battalion (Sanitetsbataljonen), in Setermoen
 Combat Service Support Battalion (Stridstrenbataljonen), in Bardufoss
 Military Police Company (Militærpolitikompaniet), in Bardufoss
The brigade is in the process of reorganisation. A previous transformation of the 2. Bataljonen to light infantry has been reverted and a fourth mechanised battalion is being formed. The reason for a fourth maneuver battalion stated by the Armed Forces is a NATO requirement four combat battalions in the combat brigades of the organisation, but in the words of Lt.-Col. Espen Strande, the army's chief public communications officer, the army has the sufficient armament and equipment for only two. A tender for new main battle tanks for the army is in progress with the 2A7 version of the German Leopard 2 currently operated and the South Korean K2 Black Panther as the two contenders for the order. However the current quantity of tanks in the Norwegian Army is insufficient for four tank squadrons and the Chief of the Army Major-General Lars Lervik has stated a requirement for at least 72 new tanks with a preference for 84 units.

References

Brigades of Norway